The Governor of Landguard Fort was a British military officer who commanded the fortifications at Landguard Fort, protecting the port of Harwich. Landguard successfully held off a Dutch raid in 1667 and continued to be used for military purposes through the 1950s. The office of Governor was abolished in 1833, and of Lieutenant-Governor in 1854.

Governors of Landguard Fort
1628–1648: Henry Rich, 1st Earl of Holland
1648–1652: Thomas Ireton 
1652–1655: Benjamin Gifford
1655–1659: Mathew Cadwell
1659–1660: Humphrey Brewster
1660–1664: Charles Rich, 4th Earl of Warwick
1664–1665: Henry Farr
1665–1666: James Howard, 3rd Earl of Suffolk
1666–1667: Henry Farr
1667–1670: Nathaniel Darell
1670–1680: Sir Charles Lyttelton, 3rd Baronet
1680–1687: Sir Roger Manley
1687–1688: William Eyton
1688–1694: Henry Killigrew
1694–1696: Edward Fitzpatrick
1697–1711: Edward Jones
1711–1719: Francis Hammond
1719–1744: Bacon Morris
1744–1753: Mordaunt Cracherode
1753–1768: Lord George Beauclerk
1768–1770: Robert Armiger
1770–1777: Sir John Clavering
1778–1788: Hon. Alexander Mackay
1788–1800: Harry Trelawny
1800–1801: David Dundas
1801–1823: Cavendish Lister
1823–1833: Sir Robert Brownrigg, 1st Baronet

Lieutenant-Governors of Landguard Fort
1687–1711: Francis Hammond
1711–1717: Matthew Draper
1717–1718: Gwyn Vaughan
1718–1719: Bacon Morris
1719–172x: Hugh Plunknet
1727–1753: Edward Hayes
1753–1766: Philip Thicknesse
1766–1804: Anketell Singleton
1804–1806: John Blake
1806–1811: Alexander Mair
1811–1854: Charles Augustus West

References

History of Suffolk
Landguard Fort
Suffolk-related lists
1628 establishments in England